Farman Ahmed (born 8 October 1988 is an Indian former cricketer. He played eleven Twenty20 cricket matches for Delhi between 2009 and 2012.

See also
 List of Delhi cricketers

References

External links
 

1983 births
Living people
Indian cricketers
Delhi cricketers
Cricketers from Delhi